Slovenské Pravno is a village and municipality in Turčianske Teplice District in the Žilina Region of northern central Slovakia.

History
In historical records the village was first mentioned in 1113.

Sights
Rococo manor house built in  1754

Geography
The municipality lies at an altitude of 505 metres and covers an area of 17.168 km². It has a population of about 952 people.

References

External links
Various statistics of the region

Villages and municipalities in Turčianske Teplice District